Païta is a commune in the suburbs of Nouméa in the South Province of New Caledonia, an overseas territory of France in the Pacific Ocean. New Caledonia's international airport, La Tontouta International Airport, is located there.

Geography

Climate
Païta features a tropical savanna climate (Köppen: Aw).

Population

Sights 

The Catholic church in the centre of Paita was built in 1875. The modern Cultural Centre in the High Street is used for various exhibitions and cultural performances. The Town Hall (Mairie) is close by.

About one mile from the town centre to the north, is the former railway station of the Nouméa-Païta railway where a small locomotive which was used until 1940 can be seen.

In the southeast of Paita petroglyphs possibly dating from the 13th or 14th century B.C. can be seen on a rock at a small river. Some of the petroglyphs look similar to the sun or to flowers. From the road the place can be reached by cement stairs behind a wooden pavilion.

References

External links 
Official Website 

Communes of New Caledonia